Pürksi is a village in Lääne-Nigula Parish, Lääne County, in western Estonia.

Pürksi manor
Pürksi estate was founded in 1620. The building is from 1852. It was the home of artist Johann Carl Emanuel von Ungern-Sternberg (1773-1830), some of whose works are currently at the Art Museum of Estonia, Tallinn. The manor, which lies in a part of Estonia that formerly had a sizeable Swedish minority, is today occupied by a school that is specialised in teaching Swedish.

See also
Estonian Swedes

References

Villages in Lääne County
Manor houses in Estonia